Shreya Dhanwanthary (born 29 August 1988) is an Indian actress and model who works in Hindi and Telugu language films and web series. She got her big break in 2019 as she played Zoya in the Amazon Prime Video web series The Family Man and later gained widespread critical acclaim for her portrayal of journalist Sucheta Dalal in Sony LIV's web series Scam 1992 (2020).

Early life
Shreya Dhanwanthary was born on 29 August 1988 in Hyderabad to a Hindi-speaking father and a Telugu-speaking mother. She moved to Dubai with her parents when she was two months old. Brought up in Middle East and Delhi, Dhanwanthary graduated from NIT Warangal in Electronics and Communication Engineering.

Career
Dhanwanthary participated in Femina Miss India South 2008 when she was a third year engineering student. She placed 1st Runner-Up in the event. After that she went on to compete at Miss India 2008 as a finalist.

Soon after Miss India 2008, she was offered a role in the Telugu film like Josh and Sneha Geetham. She made her Bollywood debut with Why Cheat India opposite Emraan Hashmi. She has also authored a book titled Fade To White.

In 2019, she played Zoya in the web series The Family Man of Amazon Prime for season 1 and continued the role in Season 2 (June 2021) on Amazon Prime. In 2020, she played Sucheta Dalal in the webseries Scam 1992. In 2021, Dhanwanthary is seen playing the role of Mansi in the Amazon Prime web series Mumbai Diaries 26/11. Directed by Nikkhil Advani and produced by Emmay Entertainment, it also features Konkona Sen Sharma, Mohit Raina and Tina Desai in the lead roles.

Media 
Dhanwanthary was ranked at the 43rd place in The Times of India "Most Desirable Women List" in 2020. Popular brands endorsed by her include Airtel, Pantaloons, Safi, Provogue, Vogue Eyewear, Gitanjal Maya Gold jewellery, D'damas jewellery, Jashn Sarees and Liberty Footwear.

Filmography

Films

Television
All shows are in Hindi unless otherwise noted.

References

External links 

 
 
 

Living people
1988 births
Actresses from Hyderabad, India
Female models from Hyderabad, India
Indian film actresses
Indian television actresses
Actresses in Hindi cinema
Actresses in Telugu cinema
Actresses in Hindi television
Telugu actresses
Indian expatriates in the United Arab Emirates
National Institutes of Technology alumni
21st-century Indian actresses